Olavsvern is a decommissioned Royal Norwegian Navy base located just outside the city of Tromsø.  It is located along the European route E8 at the entrance to the Ramfjorden from the Balsfjorden.

History
During the Cold War, Norway wanted a secret naval base within the Arctic Circle. The base was essentially carved into a mountain just outside the city of Tromsø. It is a massive complex constructed at a cost of 4 billion Kroner burrowed into a mountain. It lost its status as an Orlogsstasjon (navy base) in 2002 and was consequently closed down in 2009 by the government of Jens Stoltenberg.

Infrastructure
In one of the mountain halls, there is a dry dock for submarines. The internal dry dock is capable of accommodating 6 submarines simultaneously. 

The base further consists of a  dry dock, workshops, offices and ammunition depots. The base also has external docks capable of accommodating larger ships, among other US Navy SSN's and SSBN's.

Accidents
In 2005, an accident in a scuba exercise inside the base led to the death of SBS commander Lieutenant Colonel Richard van der Horst. The accident involved a swimmer delivery vehicle during an amphibious exercise.

In late 2021 or possibly early 2022, James May suffered a broken rib when he crashed a Mitsubishi Evo in one of the tunnels during a competition between the show's presenters to see who could drive (and stop) the fastest while filming for a special episode of The Grand Tour, and was taken to the hospital.

Decommissioning 
The base was closed down in 2009 and put up for sale by the Norwegian government for 105 million Norwegian kroner (17.5 million USD) in 2011 and later sold for 38 million Kroner to Olavsvern Group Ltd, a company that announced its purpose to use the base as a maintenance base for oil platform rigs and drilling equipment. NATO approved the sale.

Post-decommissioning
The base was rented by companies from Russia  linked to state-owned Gazprom . Suspected Russian military activity aboard research vessels has concerned military experts, with Norwegian retired vice admiral Jan Reksten, former military second in command stating, ""Russia is a country where the state has a say over all commercial or semi-state business. It's clear, very few people know what happens on these vessels," stating the sale of Olavsvern was "a double loss" as "Norway's armed forces lost an important base and now there are Russian vessels docked there."

Buyback
In 2019, a subsidiary of the Wilhelmsen Group called WilNor Governmental Services Ltd acquired 66% of the stock in Olavsvern Group Ltd, thus assuring majority control of the former base. The acquisition by WilNor Governmental Services was by request from the Norwegian Defence Logistics Organization (FLO). 

The acquisition allows the Norwegian Defence Forces and its allies to resume operations at the base, as the Wilhelmsen Group has a long history of supplying and cooperating with the Norwegian Defence Forces.

In 2015, WGS entered into a long-term contract to supply strategic logistics support for Norwegian and allied forces, among others the storage of ammunition. The contract also provides for several supply bases along the Norwegian coast, in order to ensure the Royal Norwegian Navy capability to maintain Norwegian sovereignty and defend the country against external threats.
In 2020, there was talk of Olavsvern being used as a base for United States nuclear submarines.  

As of March 2021 the base has started to host allied military units, such as the Dutch Marine Corps.

References

Tromsø
Royal Norwegian Navy bases
Military installations in Troms og Finnmark